The Dhaka BRT is a bus rapid transit system in Dhaka, Bangladesh. Of two routes that were originally planned, only one section of a line is under construction from 2017, with the other route is in the planning phase.

History

Planning
In 2005, the World Bank published a study report, recommending that the government of Bangladesh build a transit system in Dhaka. In the same year, American consultancy firm Louis Berger Group prepared a strategic transport plan for Dhaka. The World Bank helped to develop this plan, which proposed the construction of a bus rapid transit system in Dhaka. In 2011, a primary feasibility study was done for BRT by the Asian Development Bank. In 1 December 2012, the ECNEC approved the Dhaka bus rapid transit project. Two lines of bus rapid transit were proposed by the government for construction.

Construction
BRT Line 3 was supposed to be completed by 2016, but construction could not begin. Because of that, the government had to extend the period of construction. As the period increased, the construction budget increased by 52.20%. On 1 December 2016, the government appointed Gezhouba Group as the contractor for the construction of the northern section of BRT Line 3, which was expected to complete construction within two and a half years. On 19 October 2017, Bangladesh Bridge Authority signed an agreement with Jiangsu Provincial Transportation Engineering Group Co. Ltd. for the construction of bridges and flyovers under the BRT project. In 2019, the Road Transport and Highways Division created a detail engineering design for the southern section of BRT Line 3. The project deadline were then revised to 30 June 2020 and June 2022 respectively, but its construction could not be completed. On 6 November 2022, Road Transport and Bridges Minister Obaidul Quader said that the northern section of BRT Line 3 is likely to be commissioned in May or June 2023. According to December 2022, the construction of the northern section was 84.4% complete. Later, the deadline was revised to December 2024.

Routes

BRT Line 3
BRT Line 3 has two sections. The northern section extends over 21 km from Gazipur to Jasimuddin Sarani, Uttara. 25 stations are being constructed in this section. The 22 km southern section will be from Hazrat Shahjalal International Airport to Jhilmil Residential Area which will consist of 16 stations.

BRT Line 7
The proposed line will be constructed from Purbachal New Town to Narayanganj.

Criticisms
Due to the construction work of BRT, the vehicles plying on the route and the passengers have suffered severally. Damage to the Dhaka–Mymensingh highway for the construction of the BRT had an impact on the country's economy.

Initially it was decided to run articulated buses on the BRT route but later it was decided to use electric buses. Later the authority decided to run diesel buses instead.

On 15 August 2022, 5 people were killed when a girder of the project fell on a private vehicle at Jasimuddin Square, Uttara. As a result, Mayor Atiqul Islam announced the closure of BRT construction in the Dhaka North City Corporation area until all types of compliance certificates are received from the contractors. The government's investigative team held the contractors accountable for the accident. As a result, the two contractors were declared ineligible for upcoming construction projects except the BRT project.

References

Bus rapid transit
Elevated bus rapid transit
Transport in Dhaka